Charles Richard Tonneman (September 10, 1881 – August 4, 1951) was a reserve catcher in Major League Baseball who played two games for the Boston Red Sox during the  season. He was born in Chicago, Illinois.

In a two-game career, Tonneman hit a three-RBI double in five at-bats for a .200 batting average. As a catcher, he collected a .990 fielding percentage (two errors in 20 chances).
 
Tonneman died at the age of 69 in Prescott, Arizona.

External links
Baseball Reference
Retrosheet

Boston Red Sox players
Major League Baseball catchers
Baseball players from Illinois
1881 births
1951 deaths
Pueblo Indians players
Springfield Midgets players
Nashville Vols players
Toronto Maple Leafs (International League) players
Jersey City Skeeters players
Memphis Chickasaws players
Kansas City Packers players
Covington Blue Sox players
Venice Tigers players
San Francisco Seals (baseball) players
Salt Lake City Skyscrapers players
Topeka Jayhawks players
St. Joseph Drummers players